Pareuchontha albimargo is a moth of the family Notodontidae. It is found in Ecuador and Peru.

References

Moths described in 1989
Notodontidae of South America